Ahmad Alafasi (born 10 January 1983) is a Kuwaiti athlete who competed in the Men's Double Trap Shooting competition in the 2016 Summer Olympics. He participated within the Independent Olympic Athletes team.

References

External links
 
 
 
 

1983 births
Living people
Kuwaiti male sport shooters
Olympic shooters of Kuwait
Shooters at the 2016 Summer Olympics
Olympic shooters as Independent Olympic Participants
Asian Games bronze medalists for Kuwait
Shooters at the 2014 Asian Games
Medalists at the 2014 Asian Games
Asian Games medalists in shooting
Shooters at the 2018 Asian Games